Pannalal Barupal (6 April 1913 – 19 May 1983) was an Indian politician, Indian independence activist and a member of the Indian National Congress political party. He was member of the Lok Sabha representing Ganganagar constituency in Rajasthan state for five terms from 1952 to 1977.

He was born in Bikaner and actively  participated in the non-cooperation movement and in the 1942 Quit India Movement. The Government of India issued a postage stamp in his honor on 28 April 2006.

He was founder of the reformist organisation, Meghwal Sudhar Sabha.

References 

People from Bikaner
Rajasthani politicians
Indian independence activists from Rajasthan
India MPs 1952–1957
India MPs 1957–1962
India MPs 1962–1967
India MPs 1967–1970
India MPs 1971–1977
1913 births
1983 deaths
Lok Sabha members from Rajasthan
People from Sri Ganganagar district
Indian National Congress politicians from Rajasthan